The Marquette Hotel is a historic former hotel structure located at 338 Broadway St. in Cape Girardeau, Missouri.  The Mission/Spanish revival style building was designed by Walter P. Manske and George F. Bartling and built in 1928.  The north wing was added in 1936.  It is six stories high, includes a full basement, and has 115 guest rooms. It is constructed of reinforced concrete and brick with a flat concrete slab roof.  It features twin Spanish-style towers that flank each side of the facade with hipped terra cotta tile roofs and double Romanesque arched openings separated by Moorish-style spiral columns.

It was added to the National Register of Historic Places in 2002.

References

Hotel buildings completed in 1928
Hotels in Missouri
Hotels established in 1928
Buildings and structures in Cape Girardeau, Missouri
Hotel buildings on the National Register of Historic Places in Missouri
1928 establishments in Missouri
National Register of Historic Places in Cape Girardeau County, Missouri